Team Penske (formerly Penske Racing) is an American professional auto racing organization, competing in the IndyCar Series, NASCAR Cup Series, IMSA SportsCar Championship and FIA World Endurance Championship. Debuting at the 1966 24 Hours of Daytona, the organization has also competed in various other types of professional racing such as Formula One, Can-Am, Trans Am, FIA World Endurance Championship and Australian Supercars. Altogether, Team Penske has earned over 500 victories and over 40 championships in all of auto racing. Team Penske is a division of Penske Corporation, and is owned and chaired by Roger Penske. The team president is Tim Cindric.

IndyCar Series
Team Penske currently fields three cars: the No. 2 Hitachi Dallara/Chevrolet for Josef Newgarden, the No. 3 Dallara/Chevrolet driven by Scott McLaughlin, and the No. 12 Verizon Dallara/Chevrolet driven by Will Power. Notable past drivers include 4-time Indianapolis 500 winners Al Unser, Rick Mears, and Helio Castroneves.  Prior to the 2022 race, Team Penske has won the Indy 500 a record 18 times.  The team has won the series championship 16 times.

The open-wheel racing portion of Penske Racing had been based in Reading, Pennsylvania since 1973 with the cars, during the Formula One and CART era, being constructed in Poole, Dorset, England, which was also the base for the F1 team. On October 31, 2005, Penske Racing announced after the 2006 IRL season, they would consolidate IRL and NASCAR operations at the team's Mooresville North Carolina facility;  with the flooding in Pennsylvania in 2006, the team's operations were moved to Mooresville earlier than expected.

IndyCar history

Early days

Roger Penske has been involved with IndyCar racing since 1968, when his team first fielded a stock block-powered Eagle with Mark Donohue. The organization first competed at Indianapolis in 1969, and within three years had become the team to beat, winning the race with Donohue in 1972. In 1978, Penske along with Pat Patrick, Dan Gurney, and several other team owners who had been participating in USAC events involving cars known as Champ Cars and IndyCars formed Championship Auto Racing Teams (CART). As of June 27, 2018, Penske Racing has won the Indianapolis 500 17 times, won the Indianapolis 500 pole position 17 times, as well as 200 open wheel IndyCar wins in USAC, CART and IRL (as of May 19, 2018), 29 of which are in 500-Mile Races and 13 open-wheel championships. Penske Racing has 1,463 starts in IndyCar races, 231 pole positions, 71 wins from pole, 47 double wins of which 8 are 1–2–3 finishes from the Pocono race on June 26, 1977, to January 1, 2015.

Oldsmobile and Chevrolet engines era
In 2001, Team Penske marked its return to the Indy 500 after a five-year absence due to the open wheel split, after the 1995 PPG IndyCar World Series season with an Oldsmobile engines. Later, in 2001 Roger Penske announced he would leave CART for the 2002 IRL IndyCar Series season with Chevrolet engines.

Toyota works engines (2003–2005)
As Toyota confirmed defection from CART Champ Car to IRL IndyCar Series, the team switched to full-works Toyota engines from 2003 season onwards as it was announced on April 2, 2002. The team's partnership with Toyota engines started well in 2003 including winning the 2003 Indianapolis 500 in the hands of Gil de Ferran. However, Team Penske's Toyota partnership started to decline in 2004 by scoring only two wins, five pole positions, and three fastest laps compared to 2003 due to driver errors and also incidents. The team also resurged slightly in 2005 with just only three wins and two pole positions.

Honda works engines (2006–2011)
On October 31, 2005, it was announced that Team Penske ended their engine deal with Toyota which included Toyota's exit from IndyCar Series and reforged their historical full-works partnership with Honda with an initial five-year deal as Honda increased its IndyCar Series partnership role to exclusive global engine partner. Penske had collaborated with Honda engines in the 2000–2001 CART Champ Car season. After a prolonged period, the team announced Hélio Castroneves and Sam Hornish Jr. as their official race drivers. Despite the Honda partnership, Penske had a de facto direct Honda factory support, with engines coming straight from the Japanese company's racing division in Japan and the United States including tune-up support from Ilmor Engineering in Plymouth, Michigan. The partnership started well in 2006, winning the 2006 Indianapolis 500 and 2006 IndyCar Series titles at the hands of Sam Hornish Jr..

Penske retained their Castroneves - Hornish Jr. pair for the 2007 season. The second year of the renewed Honda partnership was much more promising than the first with the team coming close to defending their Indianapolis 500 victory, as well as their IndyCar Series driver and team titles. However, the team slumped, scoring only two victories due to driver errors and incidents. The team failed to win major IndyCar silverware for the first time since the 2005 season. On November 9, 2007, Sam Hornish Jr. announced he would depart from IndyCar Series to the NASCAR Sprint Cup Series, driving full-time for the 2008 season with Team Penske American Le Mans Series confirming Porsche LMP2 driver Ryan Briscoe as Castroneves's new teammate for 2008 on November 13, 2007.

Team Penske started the 2008 season poorly but Hélio Castroneves posted five top-four finishes (including two 2nd-place finishes) to start the year. Meanwhile, Ryan Briscoe was forced to adapt the Penske IndyCar car, as Briscoe was entering his first season with Team Penske after spending two years as an IndyCar part-timer whilst he raced in the Champ Car World Series in 2006 and later the American Le Mans Series in 2007. Ryan Briscoe finally scored his first win at the Milwaukee Mile while Castroneves claimed his first 2008 win in Infineon Raceway. Castroneves nearly won the championship at Chicagoland Speedway, but Scott Dixon finished in 2nd place to ensure his 2008 IndyCar Series driver's title.

For 2009, Verizon Wireless, joined ExxonMobil (McLaren's then fuel and lubricant partner) as associate sponsors, and the team was billed as Verizon Championship Racing. The third car was driven by Will Power (originally a substitute for Castroneves) and carried the No. 12 and featured primary sponsorship of both the Verizon Wireless brand and Roger Penske's truck rental business.

For the 2010 season, the team entered their fifth year of its Penske-Honda partnership with Will Power promoted to a full-time Penske seat alongside Castroneves and Briscoe. Team Penske became a three-car team for the first time since 1994, with the addition of a full-time team for Power. Team Penske started the 2010 season in style by winning the first three races of the season. Will Power challenged for the driver's title until suspension failure in the season finale at Homestead-Miami Speedway robbed him of a shot at the championship. Penske ended up finishing the 2010 season with nine wins, thirteen pole positions, and six fastest laps (mostly by Will Power).

On 12 November 2010, Penske confirmed that they would end their partnership with Honda at the end of the 2011 season and use engines supplied by Chevrolet for the 2012 season. For the 2011 season, the team entered their sixth and final year of its Penske-Honda partnership. Penske's trio of Castroneves-Briscoe-Power remained for the second consecutive year while the team lost the ExxonMobil sponsorship to Stewart-Haas Racing's NASCAR team in favor of Shell and Pennzoil as their official motor oil partner. The team started well with two victories from Will Power in the first five races. Power captured his first oval win at Texas Motor Speedway and came into the season finale at Las Vegas 18 points behind leader Dario Franchitti. However, on lap 11 of the race, Power was collected in a fiery 15-car crash that killed defending Indianapolis 500 winner Dan Wheldon. The race was cut short in Wheldon's honor and the championship points stood as they had to enter Las Vegas, giving Franchitti his third consecutive driver's title (and fourth overall). Penske finished the 2011 season with six victories, all from Will Power, while Castroneves and Briscoe went winless.

Return to Chevrolet works engines (2012–present)
Roger Penske announced a switch to full-works General Motors-owned Chevrolet engines for the 2012 IndyCar Series season onwards and thus Team Penske earned a full-factory support from General Motors and Chevrolet and also Team Penske received free engines formally from Ilmor and Chevrolet as Roger Penske has a shares at Ilmor Engineering Ltd. as well as Chevrolet official team vehicles, financial support and also Chevrolet and Ilmor staff would work with the team at their Mooresville base. Once again, Penske would dominate the early portion of the season, winning 4 consecutive races, with Castroneves taking the season opener at St. Petersburg, and Power capturing wins at Barber, Long Beach, and São Paulo. Briscoe would have struggles throughout the season but managed to find victory lane at Sonoma. However, Power would come up short in the championship after a crash at the season finale. Briscoe left the team after 2012 for other opportunities.

In 2014, Will Power took the IndyCar Championship for Team Penske after 3 concurrent runner up finishes in 2010–2012.

The 2015 season started well for Team Penske, Juan Pablo Montoya won the first race of the season, his second win for Penske since he arrived from NASCAR in 2014, with teammates Will Power, Helio Castroneves, and Simon Pagenaud (first season with the team) finishing 2nd, 4th, and 5th. Power got a win at the Grand Prix of Indianapolis in the 5th race of the season and just 2 weeks later, the Colombian Montoya won the Indy 500 leading again teammate Will Power. Juan Pablo Montoya would lose the championship in the final race on a tie-breaker to Scott Dixon.

Team Penske would go on to dominate 2016, filling the top 3 positions in the final standings. Capping the season with a dominating race victory, Simon Pagenaud won his first IndyCar championship, becoming the ninth Penske driver to be crowned champion. Roger Penske's organization claimed its 14th such title and its second in three years (Power won in '14).

In 2017 Team Penske signed Josef Newgarden from Ed Carpenter Racing and would secure back-to-back IndyCar championships with Newgarden winning his first in 2017. Newgarden won a second championship for the team in 2019 while Will Power and Simon Pagenaud respectively won back-to-back Indianapolis 500s in 2018 and 2019. In 2020 the team would win the most races of any team in the IndyCar series but did not win the Indianapolis 500 or secure the IndyCar championship, with Newgarden being unable to defend his title against Scott Dixon.

In 2021 Team Penske expanded again to four-time cars. The year also marked the arrival of three-time Supercars champion and former DJR Team Penske driver Scott McLaughlin to the team, marking the first time Team Penske had signed a driver without any open-wheel experience to compete in their open-wheel racing program since Rick Mears signed to compete with the team in 1978. 2021 would be a difficult season for Team Penske. While McLaughlin was given time to adapt to IndyCar racing all three of the team's former champions would see their worst years with Team Penske. Both Will Power and Josef Newgarden recorded the lowest win totals of their Team Penske tenures in 2021 and had easy victories at Detroit and Road America taken away from them in the closing laps due to mechanical failures, while Simon Pagenaud was only able to record two third-place finishes as his best result of the year.  The team also recorded their worst Indianapolis 500 a performance in a nearly twenty years; none of Team Penske's drivers qualified inside the top fifteen, Will Power was almost bumped from the starting lineup, and their best result was a third-place via a late charge by Simon Pagenaud. A bright spot for the team was their partnership with all-female operated Paretta Autosport team for the 2021 Indianapolis 500; Team Penske prepped a chassis leased from Juncos Racing and helped the team qualify Simona De Silvestro at the last spot on the starting lineup, though De Silvestro and the Penske prepped car would fail to finish the race. Scott McLaughlin would be named both IndyCar and Indianapolis 500 Rookie Of The Year while Josef Newgarden was able to finish in second place in the championship for a second consecutive season.

For 2022 Simon Pagenaud departed the team for Meyer Shank Racing, bringing Team Penske back down to three full-time IndyCar entries. The team would forge a technical alliance with the newly rebranded Juncos Hollinger Racing, who would be competing in IndyCar for their first full-time season. The partnership with Juncos would be similar to the alliance between Andretti Autosport and the aforementioned Meyer Shank Racing, where Penske would provide parts and certain setup data to Juncos and potentially lease one of their chassis to Juncos on a part-time basis. The team would struggle again at the Indianapolis 500 but their overall form would be greatly improved, with the team winning four of the first seven races of the season and nine races overall in the season. Scott McLaughlin would take his first IndyCar win at the season opener in St. Petersburg while Will Power and Josef Newgarden would hold the championship points lead at different points in the season. Will Power would ultimately clinch his second IndyCar championship at the season finale.

1994 PPG IndyCar World Series

Penske's 1994 IndyCar World Series Championship was one of, if not the most dominating performance from a race team in the history of American open-wheel racing. Roger Penske had found the key to win but also found a way to run from the competition. The new Penske PC-23 chassis with the Ilmor- Indy V8 engine would power the Penske drivers of Al Unser Jr., Paul Tracy, and Emerson Fittipaldi. The team racked up 12 wins out of 16 races, collecting 10 poles and 28 podium finishes on their way to the championship. The team also dominated a controversial May at Indianapolis. Penske debuted a radical new Mercedes-Benz engine at Indy, the 500I. This engine used a provision in the rules intended for stock block pushrod engines such as the V-6 Buick engines that allowed an extra 650 cm³ and 10 inches (4.9 psi/33.8 kPa) of boost. This extra power (at least 900 horsepower, and rumored to be over 1000) allowed the Penskes to run significantly faster, giving them the pole and outside front row on the grid for the 78th Indianapolis 500. Al Unser Jr. and Emerson Fittipaldi dominated the race, eventually lapping the field with 16 laps to go in the 200 lap race when Fittipaldi made contact with the wall coming out of Turn 4, giving Al Unser Jr. the lead and win. The only driver who finished on the lead lap was rookie Jacques Villeneuve. This one season gave Penske the Driver's Championship with Al Unser Jr., Constructor's Cup with the Penske PC-23, and Manufacturer's Cup with the Ilmor-Indy V8 engine. (In the 1995 Indy 500 Penske failed to qualify any cars for the race)

Drivers

 Mark Donohue (1968–1975)
 David Hobbs (1971)
 Gary Bettenhausen (1972–1974)
 Gordon Johncock (1972)
 Mike Hiss (1972, 1974)
 Bobby Allison (1973, 1975)
 Tom Sneva (1975–1978)
 Mario Andretti (1976–1980)
 Rick Mears (1978–1992)
 Bobby Unser (1979–1981)
 Bill Alsup (1981)
 Kevin Cogan (1982)
 Al Unser (1983–1989)
 Johnny Rutherford (1984) (injury replacement)
 Mike Thackwell (1984) (injury replacement)
 Danny Sullivan (1985–1990)
 Geoff Brabham (1989) (injury replacement)
 Emerson Fittipaldi (1990–1996)
 Paul Tracy (1991–1994, 1996–1997)
 Al Unser Jr. (1994–1999)
 Jan Magnussen (1996) (injury replacement)
 André Ribeiro (1998)
 Alex Barron (1999, 2003; 2003 as injury replacement)
 Gonzalo Rodriguez (1999) (killed at Laguna Seca Raceway)
 Tarso Marques (1999) (injury replacement)
 Gil de Ferran (2000–2003)
 Hélio Castroneves (2000–2020)
 Max Papis (2002) (injury replacement)
 Sam Hornish Jr. (2004–2007)
 Ryan Briscoe (2008–2012)
 Will Power (2009–present) (legal replacement, 1 race;  two other races in No. 12 in 2009, full-time in 2010 beyond)
 A. J. Allmendinger (2013)
 Juan Pablo Montoya (2014–2017)
 Simon Pagenaud (2015–2021)
 Oriol Servia (2016) (injury replacement)
 Josef Newgarden (2017–present)
 Scott McLaughlin (2020-present)
Note: This does not include Greg Moore, who in mid-1999 signed a contract with Penske Racing to join the team for the 2000 season.  Moore was killed in a crash on Lap 10 of the Marlboro 500 at the Auto Club Speedway in the last race of the 1999 season while in his last race for Forsythe Championship Racing.  Castroneves, who had been driving for Hogan Racing, which shut down after the 1999 season, was tapped to fill that seat.

Sponsorship
Cigarette brand Marlboro had been a sponsor with Team Penske since the 1989 Indianapolis 500, and primary sponsor of all Team Penske IndyCars since 1991. Late in 2005, Team Penske announced that Marlboro would not appear on the cars any longer following the instruction of Tobacco Master Settlement Agreement restricting cigarette advertising by name. In 2007, the IndyCar Series cars began to carry Team Penske insignia by removing Marlboro branding and sponsorship from Mobil 1 (although the cars remained painted in the Marlboro color scheme—in Formula 1 the Scuderia Ferrari Marlboro and McLaren has a similar set up due to Marlboro partnership).

In 2010, Phillip Morris USA discontinued their relationship with Team Penske, ending a 19-year partnership. The team subsequently changed their livery to black and white with red trim, reflecting Verizon sponsorship (similar to McLaren Formula One team when they had a black-silver livery from 1997 to 2005 reflecting Mercedes-Benz engines and West sponsorship).

NASCAR

Sports car racing

Trans-Am Series
Penske first fielded a blue Sunoco 1967 Chevrolet Camaro driven by Mark Donohue in this series designed for Pony cars like the Ford Mustang. Penske-entered Camaros won the series championship in 1968 and 1969. Later they  switched to a red/white/blue American Motors backed 1970 AMC Javelin, and later the restyled 1971 AMC Javelin AMX which had an aerodynamic tail spoiler and other features suggested by Donohue. American Motors won the Over 2.5-liter title in 1971, after which Penske withdrew from the championship. Penske Racing also had an alliance with the pioneer Trans-Am team, Jocko's Racing which won the 1976 Trans-Am Series championship in a Penske-leased car.

Can-Am Series

Penske Racing entered a Lola T70 in the 1966 Can-Am Series for Mark Donohue, resulting in one win at Mosport. In 1967, Penske Racing entered two Lolas, one for Mark Donohue and one for George Follmer. 1968 saw Penske switch to a McLaren M6, which had won the series in 1967. Donohue won one race that year in Can-Am at Bridgehampton. With the McLaren domination of the Can-Am, Penske switched back to Lola Cars for his 1969 Can-Am efforts, but only entered the car in one race at Mid-Ohio.

From 1972 to 1974, Penske was Porsche's official partner in the CanAm Series. In late 1971, Penske and Mark Donohue helped to develop the turbocharged version of the Porsche 917. George Follmer won the series in 1972, and Donohue dominated CanAm in 1973 with the ultimate evolution of the 917, the 917/30. The rules were changed for 1974, and Penske raced only once this year.

Endurance racing
A Lola T70 Mk IIIb entered by Penske was the surprise winner of the 1969 24 Hours of Daytona.

During the 1970 season, the competition between the 5-liter sportscars of Porsche and Ferrari turned to the advantage of the Porsche 917. In 1971, Ferrari decided to give up any official effort with the 5-liter Ferrari 512. To prepare for the 1972 season, the new works prototype Ferrari 312PB was presented and engaged by the factory in several races.

Roger Penske bought a used 512 M chassis that was dismantled and rebuilt. The car was specially tuned for long races receiving many unique features, among them were a large rear wing and aviation-inspired quick refueling system. The engine was tuned by CanAm V8 specialist Traco, and was probably able to deliver more than 600 hp (450 kW). As of today, it is unknown to what extent Penske's initiative was backed by Ferrari works. This 512M was painted in a blue and yellow livery and was sponsored by Sunoco and the Californian Ferrari dealer Kirk F. White. The car made the pole position for the 1971 24 Hours of Daytona and finished second despite an accident. For the 12 Hours of Sebring the "Sunoco" made the pole again but finished the race at the sixth position after making contact with Pedro Rodrigez's 917. Despite this misfortune, the car had proved to be a serious opponent for the 917. Not only this car was the fastest on track in Daytona and Sebring but it was also the car that had the shortest refueling time.

The presence of the 512 M "Sunoco" forced Porsche to pursue his effort of research and development on the 917: The 917K short tail was modified, and the 917 LH aerodynamics received further improvements. New Magnesium chassis were developed. An entirely new car, the 917/20 was built as a test-bed for future CanAm parts and aerodynamic "low-drag" concepts.

In Le Mans the "Sunoco" Ferrari was unable to break the 200 mph (320 km/h) barrier on the straight while the Porsche 917 LH were lightning-quick at speeds of over 240 mph (380 km/h). Mark Donohue qualified fourth anyway, which was the result of an aerodynamic configuration that favored downforce over drag, which helped in the twistier sections. The car did not have much luck in the race though.

American Le Mans Series

In April 2005, it was announced that Porsche would build an Automobile Club de l'Ouest (ACO) sanctioned LMP2 Class Prototype that would be entered by Penske Racing in the American Le Mans Series and thus formally competed as DHL Porsche Penske Racing in a reference of Porsche Motorsport works team. The  Porsche RS Spyder made its successful debut at the ALMS season final race at Mazda Raceway Laguna Seca. The "Porsche Junioren" factory drivers Sascha Maassen and Lucas Luhr finished 1st in LMP2 Class and 5th Overall in the 4–Hour Endurance Race. The livery of the Penske Racing American Le Mans Series team was inspired by Jordan EJ12's DHL Formula 1 livery driven by Giancarlo Fisichella and Takuma Sato.

In 2006, Penske Motorsports fielded two LMP2 Porsche RS Spyder in the American Le Mans Series, but did not run the 2006 24 Hours of Le Mans in June. The Penske cars combined to win seven class victories and the overall win at Mid-Ohio. Penske Racing won the LMP2 team championship. Drivers Sascha Maassen and Lucas Luhr tied for first place in the driver's championship, while Timo Bernhard finished fifth, Romain Dumas finished sixth, and Emmanuel Collard finished tenth.

2006 team lineup:
 LMP2 Porsche RS Spyder No. 6: Sascha Maassen, Lucas Luhr (with Emmanuel Collard for endurance events)
 LMP2 Porsche RS Spyder No. 7: Timo Bernhard, Romain Dumas (with Patrick Long for endurance events)

In 2007, Penske Motorsports fielded two LMP2 Porsche RS Spyder Evo in the American Le Mans Series. Penske Motorsports for the 2nd year in a row did not compete in 2007 24 Hours of Le Mans in June. Penske's two cars combined for eleven class victories and eight overall victories during the twelve race season. Penske won the LMP2 team championship, and team drivers Romain Dumas and Timo Bernhard finished tied for first in the LMP2 driver's championship, while Sascha Maassen and Ryan Briscoe tied for third place.

2007 team lineup:
 LMP2 Porsche RS Spyder No. 6: Sascha Maassen, Ryan Briscoe (with Emmanuel Collard for endurance events)
 LMP2 Porsche RS Spyder No. 7: Timo Bernhard, Romain Dumas (with Hélio Castroneves (Sebring only) and Patrick Long (Road Atlanta only) for endurance events)

Penske started their 2008 season with an overall win in the 12 Hours of Sebring. This was Porsche's first overall win in the race since 1988 in a Porsche 962.

2008 team lineup:
 LMP2 Porsche RS Spyder No. 5: Hélio Castroneves, Ryan Briscoe (Road Atlanta and Laguna Seca only)
 LMP2 Porsche RS Spyder No. 6: Sascha Maassen, Patrick Long
 LMP2 Porsche RS Spyder No. 7: Timo Bernhard, Romain Dumas (with Emmanuel Collard for endurance events)

Grand-Am Rolex Sports Car Series
On December 4, 2008, Roger Penske announced that the Team Penske officially shut down its participation in the American Le Mans Series and thus defected to ALMS's rival Grand-Am Rolex Sports Car Series for the full 2009 season. The team utilized a Porsche-powered Riley with Timo Bernhard and Romain Dumas as their official drivers. However, in late 2009, Roger Penske announced that the team would shut down its Grand-Am Rolex Sports Car Series operations and be turned into the new No. 12 Verizon sponsored IndyCar for Will Power to run full-time in 2010.

IMSA

In 2017, it was announced that Penske Racing would make a comeback to sportscar racing in IMSA's WeatherTech SportsCar Championship for the 2018 season. They will run 2 Acura ARX-05 DPis in the prototype (P) class. They ran the last race of 2017, the Petit Le Mans using the Oreca 07 LMP2 that the Acura DPi is based on, placing third. 

For the 2023 season, the team was the only one that fielded the Porsche 963 at the 2023 24 Hours of Daytona. With the No. 6 Porsche retiring due to a gearbox issue and No. 7 finishing in 7th place.

2018 line-up:
No. 6 Acura ARX-05: Juan Pablo Montoya, Dane Cameron (full season), Simon Pagenaud (endurance)
No. 7 Acura ARX-05: Hélio Castroneves, Ricky Taylor (full season), Graham Rahal (endurance)

2019-2020 line-up:
No. 6 Acura ARX-05: Juan Pablo Montoya, Dane Cameron, Simon Pagenaud 
No. 7 Acura ARX-05: Hélio Castroneves, Ricky Taylor, Alexander Rossi

Formula One

Penske entered the Formula One World Championship from 1974 to 1976. Although the cars were built at the British base in Poole, the team held an American licence. In 1971, Penske had sponsored the second McLaren entry in the 1971 Canadian and US GP, entering Mark Donohue, who took the car to a podium finish. The team returned three years later, in the 1974 Canadian GP, with their chassis, the PC1, a standard tub built around a Cosworth DFV engine and a Hewland gearbox. Donohue took the car to 12th place on its debut. In 1975, Roger Penske mounted a full season attack with the PC1, Donohue managing to score a fifth place in the Swedish GP. However, the car was retired after the French GP and Penske entered a March 751 for the next three races, scoring another fifth in the British GP. However, Donohue crashed the car in the final practice session of the 1975 Austrian Grand Prix at Spielberg and later died from his injuries. Penske missed the Italian race, returning only for the US GP, abandoning the March 751 in favor of the PC1 with Northern Irish driver John Watson.

For 1976, Penske signed a sponsorship deal with Citibank and entered a brand new PC3 for Watson. Despite a fifth-place score at the South African Grand Prix at Kyalami, the PC3 was evolved into the PC4, which was much more competitive, allowing Watson to score two podiums in France and Britain. Then, in the Austrian Grand Prix, the team scored their only F1 win. So far this has been the last time an American constructor won an F1 race. Still, at the end of the year, Penske decided to withdraw from the sport to concentrate solely on Indycar racing, selling the remains of his European operations to Günter Schmid of Germany.

For 1977, the car was entered by Schmidt's ATS Wheels business and run under the name of ATS Racing Team. The ATS-Penske PC4, now painted yellow, debuted in the 1977 United States Grand Prix West with Jean-Pierre Jarier at the wheel, where the Frenchman scored the team's single point of the season. A second PC4 was eventually entered for Hans Heyer (who started the 1977 German Grand Prix despite failing to qualify) and Hans Binder (3 races) but the team's fortunes sank and Schmidt quit after the Italian GP, before returning in 1978 with his chassis. A third PC4 was built by Penske for Interscope Racing, who entered the car in the United States and Canadian Grands Prix, driven by American Danny Ongais with no results.

In 1979 Penske designed and built the HR100 for wealthy Mexican 'gentleman driver' Héctor Rebaque. The car was entered for the final three races of the season, but either failed to qualify or to finish in each case.

Supercars Championship

In 2015, Team Penske entered the Australian V8 Supercars Championship, having purchased a 51% stake in Dick Johnson Racing in September 2014. The team was known as DJR Team Penske. The team raced a single Ford Falcon FG X in 2015, initially with Marcos Ambrose driving car No. 17 and Scott Pye as a co-driver in the Endurance Cup. Following the Australian Grand Prix support race, Ambrose requested to step aside from driving to let Scott Pye become the main driver from Round 2 at Symmons Plains onwards. Ambrose then became the endurance co-driver in the Endurance Cup.

In October 2015, DJR Team Penske announced a return to a two-car team in 2016 with Fabian Coulthard to drive car No. 12 and Scott Pye in car No. 17. Roger Penske later confirmed that Ambrose elected not to continue as a co-driver in 2016.

For the 2017 season, Scott McLaughlin joined the team and became the new driver for the No. 17 Ford Falcon FG X Supercar.
DJR Team Penske took out the 2017 Teams Championship, and in the following year Scott McLaughlin took out the 2018 Drivers Championship in the Australia Supercars Championship. 
In 2019 he took out his second Drivers Championship winning an Australian Touring Cars/Supercars record of 18 races and with co-driver Alex Premat, Scott McLaughlin won his first Bathurst 1000. In October 2020, Penske sold back its shareholding in DJR Team Penske.

Indianapolis 500 statistics
Penske Racing has the most Indianapolis 500 victories of any team in auto-racing history with 18 victories. In 1972, Penske driver Gary Bettenhausen led the most laps but lost an engine with 24 laps to go. His teammate Mark Donohue led the waning laps en route to Penske's first Indianapolis 500 victory. In 1979, Penske driver Bobby Unser led the most laps of the Indianapolis 500 while teammate Rick Mears won the race, from the pole.

Penske's next 500 victory was one of the most controversial finishes in IndyCar history. Penske driver Unser won the pole position and led most of the final 100 laps. On lap 140, Bobby Unser and former Penske driver Mario Andretti came out of the pits. Unser passed 11 cars under a yellow flag while Andretti passed 2 cars. Unser won the race but was stripped of the victory the next morning in favor of Andretti. After a lengthy appeal, Unser was reinstated the victory and was instead fined $40,000 ($104,000 in today's money). Unser retired from racing after the season was over in the fall-out of the controversy.

Penske's next Indy 500 win was with Rick Mears in 1984. Mears and former Penske driver Tom Sneva battled for the lead in the final 100 laps but after Sneva dropped out with a broken CV joint, Mears led the final 40 laps unchallenged to win by 2-laps ahead of the field. The next year, first-year Penske driver Danny Sullivan led the final 61 laps en route to his first Indianapolis 500 victory after winning a 4-lap shootout with Mario Andretti. In 1987, Penske driver Danny Ongais got taken out of the race due to injuries and former Penske driver Al Unser was tabbed as a temporary replacement. Unser won the race.

1988 was one of the most dominating performances by Penske Racing in the history of the Indianapolis 500. Penske's team members, Sullivan, Unser, and Mears qualified in the front row and proceeded to lead 192 of the race's 200 laps, 91 by Sullivan, 89 by Mears, and 12 by Unser. Mears won the race. In 1991, Mears won an 18-lap duel with Michael Andretti to win his 4th Indianapolis 500. Emerson Fittipaldi won the 500 in 1993 but angered American fans by drinking orange juice instead of the traditional milk.

In 1994, the Penske team, consisting of Al Unser Jr., Paul Tracy and Emerson Fittipaldi led 193 of the race's 200 laps, thanks to a new engine invented by Penske that went up to 1000 horsepower. The engine was later banned, which resulted in Penske Racing not qualifying a single car in the 1995 Indianapolis 500.

Due to the open-wheel split, Penske did not field a car at the Indianapolis 500 from 1996 to 2000. In 2001, Penske Racing crossed a picket-line by fielding the team in the 500, consisting of rookie Hélio Castroneves and Gil de Ferran. The duo proceeded to lead the most laps, en route to the victory, giving Penske Racing a 1-2 finish, the first time in the team's history. In a post-race interview, Roger Penske said that after the heartbreak in 1995, the win was the biggest of all his Indy 500 wins.

In 2002, Castroneves barely beat Paul Tracy to win his second consecutive Indy 500. Controversy overshadowed the race when videotapes appeared to have shown that Tracy was ahead of Castroneves at the moment of a final-lap caution. After a lengthy appeal, Castroneves' win was upheld on July 2. In 2003, Gil de Ferran won his first 500 and then retired when the season was over. Penske Racing has since proceeded to win the 500 in 2006, 2009, 2015, 2018, and 2019.

Penske Racing Museum

Opened in 2002, the Penske Racing Museum in Scottsdale, Arizona, is located within a complex of Penske Automotive Group car dealerships at the Scottsdale 101 Auto Collection. The two-story,  museum houses approximately 20 historically significant Penske Racing cars, along with trophies, artwork, engines, and other memorabilia dating from Penske Racing's earliest origins up to the present day. Displays are rotated regularly, but the museum focuses primarily on the team's successes in the Indy 500 and NASCAR, with lesser emphasis on F1 and sports car racing.

Racing results

USAC Championship Car results
(key) (Results in bold indicate pole position; results in italics indicate fastest lap)

1 Mike Hiss was hired by Penske to qualify Mario Andretti's #7 car for the 1978 Indianapolis 500 while Andretti was racing in Formula One; Andretti would then drive the car on race-day.

Championship Auto Racing Teams (CART) results
(key)

† Gonzalo Rodríguez was killed during qualifying for the Laguna Seca race.
1 The Firestone Firehawk 600 was canceled after qualifying due to excessive g-forces on the drivers.

IndyCar Series results
(key)

* Season still in progress

  Non-points-paying, exhibition race.
  The final race at Las Vegas was abandoned after 12 laps due to Dan Wheldon's death.

Complete Formula One World Championship results

(italics indicates non-works entries; bold indicates championships won)

IMSA SportsCar Championship results

Championships and major wins

IndyCar champions

Indianapolis 500 victories

IndyCar wins

WeatherTech SportsCar Championship wins

NASCAR Cup Series champions

NASCAR Xfinity Series champion

Daytona 500 victories

Supercars champion

Notes

External links

IndyCar Team Page

 
American Motors
American auto racing teams
American racecar constructors
Companies based in North Carolina
Penske
Penske
IndyCar Series teams
NASCAR teams
American Le Mans Series teams
Champ Car teams
Can-Am entrants
Racing
WeatherTech SportsCar Championship teams
FIA World Endurance Championship teams
Porsche in motorsport
Supercars Championship teams
24 Hours of Le Mans teams